is a Japanese footballer who plays for Nara Club.

Career
On 22 July 2019, Endo joined Nara Club.

Club statistics
Updated to 23 February 2020.

References

External links

Profile at Fujieda MYFC
Profile at Kataller Toyama

1989 births
Living people
People from Ichihara, Chiba
Association football people from Chiba Prefecture
Japanese footballers
J2 League players
J3 League players
Mito HollyHock players
Thespakusatsu Gunma players
FC Machida Zelvia players
Fujieda MYFC players
Kataller Toyama players
Nara Club players
Vonds Ichihara players
Association football forwards